

John Richard Erickson (born October 20, 1943) is an American cowboy and author, best known for his Hank the Cowdog series of children's novels.

Born in Midland, Texas, he was reared in Perryton in the northern Texas Panhandle. He graduated in 1966 from the University of Texas at Austin and spent two years at Harvard Divinity School. He began publishing short stories in 1967, while still working as a cowboy and ranch manager in Texas and Oklahoma. Hank and Drover are both dogs he'd worked with at the ranch.

In 1982, after receiving numerous rejection slips from large publishers, Erickson borrowed $2,000 and began his own publishing company, Maverick Books. Hank the Cowdog debuted in The Cattleman, and two related short stories appeared in the first book published by Maverick Books, The Devil in Texas. Erickson began selling books out of his pickup truck wherever cowboys gathered.

Erickson soon found himself receiving letters addressed to Hank, and so, the next year, in 1983, he published the first full-length book in the series, The Original Adventures of Hank the Cowdog. His 2,000-book first printing ran out in six weeks. With the book's success, he shortly afterward recorded the book, word-for-word, on audio tape. Hank the Cowdog has since become the longest-running successful children's series on audio.

That book has since spawned over seventy sequels, becoming one of the most popular children's fiction series, selling more than 7.5 million books and winning several awards. The full series of books and tapes are usually available in most school libraries around the United States. His books are endorsed by the Texas Library Association and have, for two years, been serialized in The Dallas Morning News.  His "Hank the Cowdog" series has been translated into Persian, Spanish, Danish, and Chinese, and have sold over 8.5 million copies.

Erickson has written over seventy books, and is frequently invited to perform, reading book selections and singing songs, in classrooms and school libraries. He lives in Perryton with his wife.

Life and career
He was born John Richard Erickson in Midland, Texas on October 20, 1943. His parents were Joseph W. Erickson and Anna Beth Curry Erickson. In 1946 the family moved to Perryton in the Texas Panhandle. John Erickson attended school in Perryton and upon graduation studied at the University of Denver for a year. He then attended the University of Texas, where he met his future wife Kristine. They were married in 1967. Erickson later went to Harvard Divinity School but walked away a few credits short of graduating.

After leaving Harvard, Erickson began working as a cowboy and ranch manager on various ranches in Texas and Oklahoma. In 1982 he set up his own publishing company, Maverick Books, and began writing the Hank the Cowdog stories. On March 6, 2017, Erickson's ranch home was destroyed in the fires that swept across more than 315,000 acres of the Texas Panhandle. Upon his loss from the blaze, he quoted Scripture: "Naked we came into this world and naked we will leave it," and added, "but we will sure miss that house." His property is south of Perryton in Roberts County. In the books, Hank is "Head of Ranch Security" of an unnamed ranch in nearby Ochiltree County.

Bibliography 
As of December 2022, there are 78 printed books in the Hank the Cowdog series, 7 audio-only titles, and 6 CDs of music from the audiobooks.   Erickson has also written a number of non-Hank books.

 Through Time and the Valley (1978).  Shoal Creek Publishers, Maverick Books, and University of North Texas Press.
 Panhandle Cowboy (1980).  With a preface by Larry McMurtry.  University of Nebraska Press and University of North Texas Press.
 The Modern Cowboy (1981).  University of Nebraska Press and University of North Texas Press.
 The Devil in Texas and Other Cowboy Tales (1982).  Maverick Books and Gulf Publishing Company.
 Cowboys Are Partly Human (1983). Maverick Books and Gulf Publishing Company.
 Alkali County Tales (1984).  Maverick Books and Gulf Publishing Company.
 The Hunter (1984).  Doubleday and Company.
 Ace Reid:  Cowpoke (1984).  Maverick Books.
 Essays on Writing and Publishing (1985).  Maverick Books.
 Cowboys Are Old Enough To Know Better (1986).  Maverick Books and Gulf Publishing Company.
 Cowboys Are a Separate Species (1986).  Maverick Books and Gulf Publishing Company.
 Cowboy Country (1986).  Maverick Books.
 Cowboy Fiddler (1992).  With Frankie McWhorter.  Texas Tech Press and University of North Texas Press.
 Horse Fixin’:  Forty Years of Working With Problem Horses (1992).  With Frankie McWhorter.  Texas Tech Press
 Catch Rope—The Long Arm of the Cowboy (1994).  University of North Texas Press.
 LZ Cowboy:  A Cowboy’s Journal 1979-81 (1999).  University of North Texas Press.
 Some Babies Grow Up To Be Cowboys:  A Collection of Articles and Essays (1999).  University of North Texas Press.
 Friends:  Cowboys, Cattle, Horses, Dogs, Cats, and Coons (2002).  University of North Texas Press.
 Prairie Gothic:  The Story of a West Texas Family (2005).  Foreword by Elmer Kelton.  University of North Texas Press.
 Moonshiner’s Gold (2001).  Viking-Penguin and Maverick Books.
 Discovery At Flint Springs (2003).  Viking Press and Maverick Books.
 Story Craft:  Reflections on Faith, Culture, and Writing (2009).  Introduction by Gene Edward Veith and foreword by Nancy Pearcey.  Maverick Books.
 Fear’s Return (2011).  Maverick Books.
 Ranch Life Series, Book One: Ranching and Livestock (2016).  Maverick Books.

References

External links

 

1942 births
Living people
People from Midland, Texas
People from Roberts County, Texas
People from Perryton, Texas
American male writers
Writers from Texas
University of Denver alumni
University of Texas at Austin alumni
Harvard Divinity School alumni
Culture of Amarillo, Texas
Hank the Cowdog
Ranchers from Texas